Erin-Ijesha Waterfalls (also known as Olumirin waterfalls) is located in Erin-Ijesha. It is a tourist attraction located in Oriade local government area, Osun State, Nigeria. The waterfalls were discovered in 1140 AD by one of the daughters of Oduduwa. However, according to The Nation,"Olumirin waterfall was discovered by  hunters in 1140 AD". Another source has it that the tourist site was discovered by a woman called Akinla, founder of Erin-Ijesha town and a granddaughter of Oduduwa, during the migration of Ife people to Erin- Ijesa. The name Olumirin was given to the tourist attraction by Akinla, which means (oluwa mirin - another god).

The fall features seven levels, on top of which the village Abake is located. Abake village shared boundary with Ẹfọ̀n-Alààyè in Ekiti State.

The Erin-Ijesha Waterfalls is a popular excursion point for schools around the neighbourhood. The natives regard the waterfall as a sacred site and a means of purifying their souls. Festivals were formerly celebrated and sacrifices performed at the site.

See also
List of waterfalls
Ikogosi Warm Springs

References

External links

Tourist attractions in Osun State
Waterfalls of Yorubaland
Waterfalls of Nigeria